Jarno Väkiparta (born 13 March 1974 in Pori) is a Finnish bandy player who currently plays for Tillberga IK Bandy from Sweden.  Jarno is a forward who has represented the Finnish national team.  Jarno started his career in his homeland at Narukerä before moving to Ljusdals BK of Sweden in 1998.  He has also played for IFK Motala, Västerås SK and Katrineholms SK before moving to Tillberga. His best achievement is the World Championship gold in Bandy World Championship 2004.

External links

1974 births
Living people
Sportspeople from Pori
Finnish bandy players
Expatriate bandy players in Sweden
Ljusdals BK players
IFK Motala players
Västerås SK Bandy players
Tillberga IK Bandy players
Bandy World Championship-winning players